The 2011–12 Iowa Hawkeyes men's basketball team represented the University of Iowa in the 2011–12 college basketball season. The team was led by 2nd year head coach Fran McCaffery and played their home games at Carver-Hawkeye Arena, which has been their home since 1983. They were members of the Big Ten Conference. They finished the season with 18-17 record, 8-10 in Big Ten play finished in a tie with Northwestern in 7th place. They made to the 2012 Big Ten Conference men's basketball tournament where they defeated Illinois in the first round but then lost to Michigan State in the quarterfinals. They made to the 2012 National Invitation Tournament, where they beat Dayton in the first round, and lost to Oregon in the second round.

Roster
The 2011–12 Iowa Hawkeyes squad contained 16 players which include 4 freshmen, 1 redshirt freshman, 6 sophomores, 2 juniors, 3 seniors, and 1 redshirt senior.

2011 Commitments

Schedule and Results

|-
!colspan=12 style=| Exhibition

|-
!colspan=12 style=| Regular season

|-

|-

|-

|-

|-
!colspan=12 style=| 2012 Big Ten tournament

|-
!colspan=12 style=| 2012 National Invitation Tournament

References

Iowa Hawkeyes Men's Basketball Team, 2011-12
Iowa Hawkeyes men's basketball seasons
Iowa
Hawk
Hawk